Robert Alnwick was an English politician who was MP for Scarborough in 1393.

References

14th-century births
English MPs 1393
14th-century English politicians
Politicians from Scarborough, North Yorkshire